First-run may refer to:

First-run syndication, the first broadcast of a television program after it is licensed for syndication
First run (filmmaking), describing films that are newly released 
First Run (West Virginia), a stream in West Virginia
First Run Features, an independent film distribution company based in New York City
First Run Film Festival, a film festival presented by the Kanbar Institute of Film & Television